Mykola Medin (born May 4, 1972 in Nikopol) is a Ukrainian professional football coach and a former player.

Currently, he is a goalie manager with the FC Dnipro.

Honours
Top awards
 Soviet Top League champion: 1988.
 Soviet Cup winner: 1989.
 USSR Super Cup winner: 1989.
 USSR Federation Cup winner: 1989.
Minor awards
 Soviet Top League runner-up: 1989.
 USSR Federation Cup finalist: 1990.
 Ukrainian Premier League runner-up: 1993.
 Ukrainian Premier League bronze: 1992, 1995, 1996.

External links
 

1972 births
Living people
People from Nikopol, Ukraine
Soviet footballers
Soviet Union youth international footballers
Ukrainian footballers
Ukrainian expatriate footballers
Ukrainian football managers
FC Dnipro players
FC Dnipro-2 Dnipropetrovsk players
FC Dnipro-3 Dnipropetrovsk players
FC Elista players
FC Elektrometalurh-NZF Nikopol players
SC Tavriya Simferopol players
Expatriate footballers in Russia
Ukrainian expatriate sportspeople in Russia
Ukrainian Premier League players
Ukrainian First League players
Ukrainian Second League players
Russian Premier League players
Association football midfielders
Sportspeople from Dnipropetrovsk Oblast